The Gulf Coast pygmy sunfish, Elassoma gilberti, is a species of pygmy sunfish endemic to Florida, United States.  This species can reach  in standard length.

Etymology
The fish is named in honor of Carter R. Gilbert (1930-2022), who was the Curator of Fishes at the Florida Museum of Natural History from 1961 to 1998, because of his many contributions to the study of North American fishes.

Elassoma gilberti is closely related to E. okefenokee, and the two species are nearly indistinguishable in appearance.  E. gilberti in general has four preopercular canal pores, while E. okefenokee on average has three. The average number of anal fin rays is seven in E. gilberti and eight in E. okefenokee.  The female E. gilberti often expresses a blue patch of color behind her eye, while the E. okefenokee does not.

Range and ecology
This species occurs in northwestern Florida and southwestern Georgia in the lower Suwannee River drainage and other Gulf of Mexico drainages from the Waccasassa River west to Choctawhatchee Bay. They are usually found in slackwater environments, among dense aquatic vegetation and leaf litter, where they feed mainly on tiny insects, crustaceans, and worms.

Spawning
Elassoma gilberti will breed in a wide range of water conditions, and spawning has been confirmed in both 0 DH and 20 DH water.  Males require a region of dense living or artificial rooted aquatic plants to claim as territory to woo females in to spawn.  Each spawning male claims about a cubic foot of volume as his territory.  The males spend their time patrolling around their territories and dancing to catch the females' attention.  When dancing, they wiggle their dorsal, anal, and caudal fins to show off their bright blue iridescence.  Then, suddenly, they do a full stop, holding completely still for a few seconds with no visible motion.  After the pause, they continue dancing again, often moving up and down in their eagerness to woo the female into their respective clumps of dense plants.  Females swim in and out of the males' territories to spawn.  The male then guards the spawn site until the eggs hatch, chasing females and other males away.

It takes about three to four days for the eggs to hatch.  At this point, the male stops protecting the spawn site and becomes receptive to spawning again.

References
 Elassoma gilberti, A new species of pygmy sunfish (Elassomatidae) from Florida and Geordia, Franklin F. Snelson Jr., Trevor J. Krabbenhoft, and Joseph M. Quattro, 2009.
 Breeding and captive care discussion topic hosted by the North American Native Fishes Association:  http://forum.nanfa.org/index.php/topic/10536-elassoma-gilberti/

Elassoma
Endemic fauna of the United States
Freshwater fish of the Southeastern United States
Suwannee River
Least concern biota of the United States
Taxa named by Franklin F. Snelson Jr., 
Taxa named by Trevor James Krabbenhoft & 
Taxa named by Joseph Michael Quattro
Fish described in 2009
Freshwater fish of North America